Al-Markazul Islami As-Salafi (Arabic: المركز الإسلامي السلفي) is an Islamic educational institution of Bangladesh that is based upon Manhaj Salaf and run by Ahlehadeeth Movement Bangladesh, with a difference in curriculum and standard system. It is in Rajshahi, the eastern division of Bangladesh.

History 
Al-Markazul Islami As-Salafi was established in Nawdapara, Sapura, Rajshahi in 1981. It was established by the local religious leaders as a Hifj Madrasa. Then it was remodeled and renamed Al-Markazul Islami As-Salafi in 1991.

Administration 
The Madrasa has been established by Muhammad Asadullah Al-Ghalib and managed by the education department of Ahlehadeeth Andolon Bangladesh. Since its establishment, three reputed Islamic scholars have served as the principal of the Madrasa.
 Abdus Samad Salafi (1991–2008)
 Abdur Razzaque bin Yousuf (2009-2014)
 Abdul Khaleque salafi (2014–2021)

Students 
The students number up to 1000 including both the male and females on the campus of this madrasa. Each year a few students from the madrasa go to Saudi Arabia's various universities to achieve higher education.

References 

1981 establishments in Bangladesh
Educational institutions established in 1981
Madrasas in Bangladesh
Rajshahi